Freddi Fish 2: The Case of the Haunted Schoolhouse is a 1996 video game and the second of five adventure games in the Freddi Fish series of games developed and published by Humongous Entertainment. It was released on iOS under the title Freddi Fish Haunted Schoolhouse Mystery and on Android with a shortened title Freddi Fish: Haunted Schoolhouse.

Plot 
Freddi Fish swims to school and waits for Luther, who brings his Codfish Commando Action Figure for show and tell. As they enter the classroom, the other guppies in their class are hiding. Mrs. Croaker explains that the guppies saw a ghost that stole their toys. While one of the students tells the story, the ghost makes a sudden appearance. It swipes down, steals Luther's action figure and swims out of the classroom. Freddi thinks the ghost isn't real, saying there's no such thing as ghosts, and promises everyone that she and Luther will find the so-called ghost and bring back all the toys.

They chase the ghost into the basement. Freddi commands the ghost to stop, causing it to accidentally drop Luther's toy and give Luther enough time to grab it. The ghost vows that it will be back to steal Luther's toy again and leaves, leaving behind a torn piece of sheet. Upon seeing this, Freddi realizes the "ghost" is really an imposter and decides to build a Rube Goldberg trap in the basement. However, Freddi says that they need to find five missing parts to set it up. She and Luther then set out to find those parts.

If Freddi and Luther leave the schoolhouse after finding and obtaining 5 parts to their trap, Boss and Spongehead try to scare the duo out of trying to defeat the ghost by telling them they would be turned "into a couple of fish sticks". Freddi isn't scared, but Luther is. When Freddi and Luther are one part away from completing the ghost trap, Boss and Spongehead go to the Squidfather, who tells them to get rid of the guppies in the classroom and give him the toys, indicating that Boss and Spongehead are responsible for the ghost hoax.

After they have everything, Freddi and Luther set up the trap and the latter agrees to use his action figure as bait. The ghost returns and tries to go after the action figure but gets trapped. Sure enough, Boss and Spongehead are revealed as the ghost and they explain they were trying to get toys for the Squidfather, who never had a toy. Freddi scolds the sharks, saying they should not steal things. However, Luther pities the Squidfather and willingly sacrifices his action figure for the sharks to give to him. The two return the toys to the guppies and explain the solution to Mrs. Croaker. The teacher congratulates Freddi and Luther on saving the school and everyone celebrates.

Gameplay 
The game uses exactly the same mechanics as its predecessor, but contains newer puzzles, collectible and usable items, character encounters, locations, minigames and trivial click spots in the gameplay. The particular parts and pieces for the ghost trap are randomized in every new game.

Development
The game was showcased at E3 1996.

Reception 

Freddi Fish 2 was generally well-received, getting a 3-star rating from Allgame, 7.6 out of 10 from IGN, 9.5 out of 10 from Electric Playground, 5 Stars from PC Magazine, and Unikgamer gave a 7.5 out 10 score. The Game Developer's Choice Awards awarded it as "Best Educational Game" in the 1997 Spotlight Awards. MacUser declared it one of 1996's top 50 CD-ROMs.

Notes

References

External links 
 
 Freddi Fish 2: The Case of the Haunted Schoolhouse at Humongous Entertainment

1996 video games
Adventure games
Detective video games
Humongous Entertainment games
Ubisoft games
Android (operating system) games
IOS games
Linux games
Classic Mac OS games
ScummVM-supported games
Video games featuring female protagonists
Windows games
Point-and-click adventure games
Video games developed in the United States
Single-player video games
Children's educational video games
Video games with underwater settings
Tommo games